Lowburn is a small settlement in Central Otago, in the South Island of New Zealand. It is located close to the shores of the man-made Lake Dunstan, which was formed by the building of the Clyde Dam. Lowburn lies between the towns of Wanaka and Cromwell.

In the early days of European settlement, a ferry crossed the Clutha River at this point. The modern economy of the settlement is largely based on orcharding and livestock, though wine production is also becoming important to the area.

Clutha River
Populated places in Otago